Yisel Denís Duque (better known under the stage name Yisel) is a Cuban-American singer-songwriter and producer. She was born in Havana, Cuba and has lived in Miami since 1988.

Early life 
Duque was born in Havana, Cuba on November 3, 1971, the younger of two siblings. In her native Havana and at her own home, she witnessed many local artists that gathered for impromptu jam sessions. Inspired by this, Yisel began singing at the young age of four. At twelve, she began to study classical guitar in the Escuela Nacional de Arte (National School of Arts, ENA), but had to quit them because her family migrated to live in Panama. In 1988, her family moved to Miami, where she still lives.

Career 
Upon her arrival in Miami, she became the youngest singer at "La Peña de la Trova", a private-owned residence in which artists would meet to sing, act, paint, and read poetry. Later on, she started college, but she quit and enrolled in the music department of Miami Dade Community College.

In 1993, an audition got her a scholarship to enter the University of Miami School of Music to study Jazz Vocal Performance, thanks to an audition, she was chosen by record producers to sing on various projects for major labels. She graduated from the UM and joined ASCAP (American Society of Composers and Publishers).

In 2002, Yisel started a jazz group named "Common Time", with a fusion of influences and different styles. The group was dissolved in 2003.

That year, she began performing as leader and background vocalist in world tours with different artists and projects, including Gloria Estefan's Live & Unwrapped, and Chayanne's No hay imposibles and En todo estaré. She also participated in many record productions and collaborated with musicians like Shakira, Alejandro Sanz, Ricky Martin, Carole King, Kevin Spacey, Lila Downs, Marc Anthony, Natalie Cole, and Prince Royce, among others.

In September 2014, she pre-released her debut album Life Is ... , with a sold-out concert in the Jackie Gleason Theater of Miami Beach. The album is best described as a "fusion of fusions" and has been regarded to as "electromagnetic". It had its worldwide released in October 6 of the same year in iTunes,  Amazon, CD Baby and most online stores.
 
She is still composing and is affiliated with various publishing companies such as Sony Music Publishing, Universal Music Publishing, Musical Productions and Sonolux, and others.

Her performance has been rated as "an explosion of raw intimacy with very personalized melodies that float over a smooth yet energy-driven soundtrack where Chill-out Lounge, R&B, and vestiges of World Music come together to form her own very unique concept of artistry and creativity. She has a rare labyrinth of soothing, intimate, and delicate cadence in her voice that simply grabs you and brings chills up your spine; and at the same time you'll feel that she is whispering her sundry and powerful voice in your ear."

References

External links
 
 Instagram

1971 births
Ballad musicians
American women singer-songwriters
Feminist musicians
Cuban feminists
Living people
University of Miami Frost School of Music alumni
Hispanic and Latino American musicians
Cuban emigrants to the United States
21st-century American singers
21st-century American women singers
Hispanic and Latino American women singers